The 2008 Copa Libertadores de América was the 49th edition of the Copa Libertadores, CONMEBOL's premier annual international club tournament. This marked the first year the competition was sponsored by Spanish bank Santander. As such, the competition is officially the 2008 Copa Santander Libertadores de América for sponsorship reasons. The draw took place on December 19, 2007, in Asunción.

Ecuadorian club LDU Quito won the competition for the first time in a final decided on penalties. It is the first time a team from Ecuador has won the competition. LDU Quito earned a berth in the 2008 FIFA Club World Cup and 2009 Recopa Sudamericana.

Qualified teams
Thirty-eight teams qualified for the competition, with twenty-six teams directly qualifying to the Second Stage and twelve entering in the First Stage. Seven countries sent their Apertura champions and Clausura champions for their first two berths. The remaining berth, or berths in Argentina's case, went to the best-placed non-champions shown by an aggregate table. Brazil's league uses a European-style format and thus does not have an Apertura and Clausura tournament. Therefore, they sent their cup champion and the best four of the Brazilian Serie A. Ecuador sent the top three finishers of their national tournament as determined by the Liguilla Final. Uruguay had a Mini-League (Liguilla) to determine who qualified, and Mexico usespecially the InterLiga to determine two of its qualifiers. The last qualified team in each country played in the First Stage; the defending champion's country had two teams in the first stage because the defending champion automatically qualified.

Teams' starting round

Round and draw dates
The calendar shows the dates of the rounds and draw.

Tie breakers
Teams at every stage of the tournament will be awarded points depending on the result of a game: 3 for a win, 1 for a draw, 0 for a loss. The following criteria will be used for breaking ties on points:

 Goal difference
 Goals scored
 Away goals
 Draw

For the first stage, round of 16, quarterfinals, and semifinals, the fourth criterion is replaced by a penalty shoot-out if necessary. The Finals have their own set of criteria; see the finals section for more details.

First stage

The First Stage was played between January 29 and February 12. Team #1 played the second leg at home.

Second stage

A total of 26 teams qualified directly to this phase and were joined by six teams from the First Stage, bringing the total to 32 teams. The top two teams from each group advanced to the round of 16. This stage was played between February 12 and April 23.

In results tables, the home team is listed in the left-hand column.

Group 1

Group 2

Group 3

Group 4

Group 5

Group 6

Group 7

Group 8

Knockout stages

The last four stages of the tournament (round of 16, quarterfinals, semifinals, and finals) form a single-elimination tournament, commonly known as a knockout stages. Sixteen teams advanced into the first of these stages: the round of 16.

Seeding
The 16 qualified teams were seeded according to their results in the Second Stage. The top teams from each group were seeded 1–8, with the team with the most points as seed 1 and the team with the least as seed 8. The second-best teams from each group were seeded 9–16, with the team with the most points as seed 9 and the team with the least as seed 16.

Bracket

Round of 16
The Round of 16 was played between April 29 and 30, and May 1, 6, and 8. Team #1 played the second leg at home.

Quarterfinals
The Quarterfinals were played on May 14, 15, and May 21 and 22. Team #1 played the second leg at home.

Semifinals
The Semifinals were played between May 27, 28, and June 3, 4. Team #1 played the second leg at home.

Finals

Top goalscorers

References

External links

 
1
Copa Libertadores seasons